Bailey Kipper's P.O.V. is an American children's sitcom that aired on Saturday mornings on CBS from September 14 until December 14, 1996, starring Michael Galeota, John Achorn and Meg Wittner. It lasted for 13 episodes of 30 minutes length each and received airings on the BBC's CBBC programming strand as well as on Nickelodeon in the UK.

It was also the first and only Saturday morning series produced by MTM Enterprises.

Plot 
Bailey Kipper's young age, 11, is belied by his wit and sophistication. His father works at a local TV station and often brings home junked bits of technical equipment for his son to mess around with, for Bailey is an electronics wizard. He constructs an elaborate spy system with which, via miniature cameras (in a form of eyeballs) he has concealed all over the house and in his family's clothing (and even in the dog's collar), he can record the family's daily activity, creating a video diary of their lives, and edit the footage for comic effect with special effects. His viewing area is hidden away in a part of the house he has made inaccessible to the others. Each episode presented the results of Bailey's handiwork as he re-ran recent events in the lives of the Kipper family - mom, dad, little brother Eric and older sister Robin.

Cast 
Michael Galeota as Bailey Kipper
John Achorn as Don 'Kip' Kipper (Dad)
Meg Wittner as Vickie Kipper (Mom)
Andi Eystad as Robin Kipper
Joey Zimmerman as Eric Kipper

Episodes

External links

1990s American children's television series
1990s American sitcoms
1996 American television series debuts
1996 American television series endings
American children's television sitcoms
CBS original programming
English-language television shows
Television series about children
Television series about families
Television series by MTM Enterprises